Roger Sharpe is an author, editor, professional pinball player, game designer, activist.

1976 NYC pinball hearing
Sharpe gained notoriety following a 1976 New York City hearing where he provided a demonstration to members of the Manhattan City Council, that pinball was a game of skill rather than a game of chance, and therefore not subject to legal prohibitions on gambling.  While working for GQ Magazine, he was recruited by the Amusement and Music Operators Association to testify, and successfully predicted the position of the ball in a machine arrayed for the council and media in attendance. Speaking at the hearing, Sharpe said "Look, there’s skill, because if I pull the plunger back just right, the ball will, I hope, go down this particular lane." Following Sharpe's demonstration, the council voted unanimously to lift the existing ban on pinball.

In 2021, MPI Original Films announced they were developing a film based on Sharpe entitled Pinball: The Man Who Saved the Game.

Work
After graduating from the University of Wisconsin in 1971 with a degree in marketing, Sharpe took a position as editor with GQ Magazine. He has written for The New York Times and authored a 1977 book entitled Pinball! (photographs by James Hamilton). He served as editor of 1980s publication Video Games Magazine.

He continued working in the industry, including designing a number of pinball machines, such as Sharpshooter and Cyclopes, which both bear his likeness. He was co-founder of the Professional Amateur Pinball Association, and has been described as "among the greatest players in the world and one of the architects of competitive pinball." He serves as co-chair of the International Flipper Pinball Association.

Family
Sharpe has two sons, Josh and Zach, who have also participated in competitive pinball. Both sons work in the gaming and pinball industry, and the trio all remain active in advocacy and coordinating pinball competitions, all variously considered among the top players in the world.

References

External links
 Audio interview with Roger Sharpe via SoundCloud

Pinball: The Man Who Saved the Game (2022 film about Sharpe)
 IMDb
 Official website

Pinball game designers
Pinball players
Living people

Year of birth missing (living people)